Christa Simmons is a beauty pageant contestant who was named Miss Guyana 2008 and went on to represent Guyana in the Miss World 2008 pageant in South Africa. She has a degree in sociology and has studied law.

External links
 Face of the Universe 2008

1985 births
Living people
Miss World 2008 delegates
Guyanese beauty pageant winners
People from Georgetown, Guyana